Kaba (Kabba), or Kabba of Goré, is a language of the Sara people in Central African Republic and Chad, with around 100,000 speakers.

There are several languages named Kaba, which is a local generic term approximately equivalent to Sara. Kaba of Gore is confusing classified as a Sara rather than as a Kaba language.

Kabba is a tonal language.  There are three tones, High (H) Mid (M) and Low (L).

References

The Sara-Bagirmi Language Project -- Kaba

Languages of the Central African Republic
Languages of Chad
Languages of Cameroon
Bongo–Bagirmi languages